Fortuna is a Mexican Spanish language telenovela produced by Argos Television for Cadena Tres. It stars Andrés Palacios and Lisette Morelos.

Cast
 Main Cast

References

2013 telenovelas
2013 Mexican television series debuts
Argos Comunicación telenovelas
Mexican telenovelas
Works about the Russian Mafia
Works about Mexican drug cartels